Park Min-jung is a South Korean actress. She is known for her roles in dramas such as The Smile Has Left Your Eyes, Mad Dog, The Tale of Nokdu and Nobody Knows. She also appeared in movies The Wrath, S.I.U, The Concubine and The Russian Novel.

Personal life 
Park Min-jung married actor Park Hoon in 2007 and they have also worked together on screen.

Filmography

Television series

Web series

Film

Awards and nominations

References

External links 
 
 

1982 births
Living people
21st-century South Korean actresses
South Korean television actresses
South Korean film actresses